Pee Wee Lambert (born Darrell Lambert; August 5, 1924 – June 15, 1965) was a mandolinist who worked with The Stanley Brothers. He left the group in 1950. He sang in a "high voice" like Bill Monroe. He highly admired Monroe. In addition to singing like him he is said to have imitated Bill Monroe's posture, dress, and facial expressions. He also worked with Curly Parker as "Bluegrass Pardners."

References

External links 
[ All Music]

American bluegrass musicians
1924 births
1965 deaths
American bluegrass mandolinists
20th-century American musicians